Samuel Kaylin (18 January 1892 – 7 July 1983) was a film composer who scored Charlie Chan and Mr. Moto movies for Fox Film and 20th Century Fox.

Early years
Kaylin was born in the Ukraine and emigrated to the United States on January 16, 1907 aboard the Norddeutscher Lloyd steamship Neckar He worked as a musician at the Chinese Theater in Los Angeles.

Hollywood
Kaylin joined Fox Film in 1930 and composed more than 80 film scores. Among them were the scores for Shirley Temple's Bright Eyes and John Ford's Judge Priest. He left 20th Century Fox, Fox Film's successor, in 1940.

Death
Kaylin died in Bakersfield, California.

Selected filmography
 Harmony at Home (1930)
 Walls of Gold (1933)
 Forbidden Melody (1933)
 Orient Express (1934)
 Nothing More Than a Woman (1934)
 Las fronteras del amor (1934)
 La cruz y la espada (1934)
 The Great Hotel Murder (1935)
 Gentle Julia (1936)
 The Jones Family in Big Business (1937)
 “ [[The Mysterious Mr. Moto (of Devil’s Island)” (1938)
 Mr. Moto in Danger Island (1939)
 The Man Who Wouldn't Talk (1940)

References

1892 births
1983 deaths
American male conductors (music)
American film score composers
Musicians from Los Angeles
20th-century American conductors (music)
20th-century American composers
Classical musicians from California
American male film score composers
20th-century American male musicians
Emigrants from the Russian Empire to the United States